George Arnold Wood (7 June 1865 – 14 October 1928) was an English Australian historian notable for writing an early work on Australian history entitled The Discovery of Australia.

Wood was born at Salford, England; he was educated at Owens College, Manchester, where he graduated B.A., and afterwards at Balliol College, Oxford, where in 1886 he won the Brackenbury history scholarship and in 1889 the Stanhope history essay prize. In 1891 he became Challis professor of history at the University of Sydney and held this chair for the remainder of his life. Before coming to Australia his chief study had been in English and European history, but he soon developed an interest in the early days of Australia and did valuable research on this period.

During the Boer War he incurred some unpopularity by advocating peace measures, but he was not a pacifist if he thought a cause a just one—only his age prevented him from enlisting during the First World War. In 1922 he published The Discovery of Australia. It was at once accepted as the standard work on the subject. His The Voyage of the "Endeavour", written for school children is also very good of its kind. He had hoped to write a history of Australia up to the deposition of Bligh, but it was never completed. Some of his preparatory work will be found in the admirable papers he contributed to the Journal and Proceedings of the Royal Historical Society, Sydney. He died at Sydney on 14 October 1928. He married Eleanor Madeline Whitfeld, who survived him with three sons and a daughter. One of his sons, Frederick Wood, became professor of history at Victoria University College in Wellington, New Zealand.

Notes

References
R. M. Crawford 'A Bit of A Rebel.' The Life and Work of George Arnold Wood. Sydney University Press. 1975.
John A. Moses, Prussian-German Militarism 1914-18 in Australian Perspective: The Thought of George Arnold Wood. Bern Peter Lang, 1991.

1865 births
1928 deaths
Australian historians
English emigrants to Australia
Academic staff of the University of Sydney